Tim Cronk (born June 22, 1987, in Kingston, Ontario) is a professional Canadian football fullback who is currently a free agent. He was first signed by the BC Lions on May 30, 2011, after going undrafted in the 2009 CFL Draft and finishing his college eligibility in 2010. He played CIS football for the Bishop's Gaiters. Cronk recently made his amateur MMA debut, winning by submission, 2 minutes into the first round. He attended Holy Cross Catholic Secondary School in Kingston.

References

External links
Winnipeg Blue Bombers bio 
Saskatchewan Roughriders bio 
BC Lions bio

1987 births
Living people
BC Lions players
Bishop's Gaiters football players
Canadian football running backs
Players of Canadian football from Ontario
Saskatchewan Roughriders players
Sportspeople from Kingston, Ontario
Winnipeg Blue Bombers players